Julia Fiquet (born 24 September 2001), better known as simply Julia, is a French singer.

At 13, she participated in the second French season of The Voice Kids (broadcast on TF1 in 2015) and thus came to the attention of Laurent Boutonnat. When later he and Mylène Farmer were looking for a new girl to record a song they wrote together called "", they chose Julia.

Discography

Albums

EPs 
  (Remixes)

Singles 
2018: ""
2019: ""
2019: ""
2020: ""
2022: ""

Music videos 
2018: ""
2019: ""
2019: ""
2020: ""

References 

21st-century French women singers
2001 births
Living people